German submarine U-42 was a Type IXA U-boat of Nazi Germany's Kriegsmarine that operated during World War II.

U-42 was ordered by Kriegsmarine in November 1936. Her keel was laid down in December 1937; she was launched in February 1939 and commissioned in July 1939.

U-42 had a very short career, being sunk while still on her first war patrol. During her service with Kriegsmarine, the boat conducted only one training patrol and one war patrol. Both her patrols were as part of the 6th U-boat Flotilla.

U-42 was sunk southwest of Ireland on 13 October 1939. Out of a crew of 46, 20 survived and 26 went down with the submarine.

Construction

U-42 was ordered by Kriegsmarine on 21 November 1936 (as part of Plan Z). Her keel was laid down on 21 December 1937 by DeSchiMAG AG Weser of Bremen as yard number 947. She was launched on 16 February 1939 and commissioned on 15 July of that same year under the command of Kapitänleutnant Rolf Dau.

Design
As one of the eight original German Type IX submarines, later designated IXA, U-42 had a displacement of  when at the surface and  while submerged. She had two shafts and two  propellers.

U-42 was fitted with six  torpedo tubes (four fitted at the bow and two at the stern), 22 torpedoes, one  SK C/32 naval gun, 180 rounds, and a  SK C/30 as well as a  C/30 anti-aircraft gun. The boat had a complement of forty-eight.

Service history

Patrol
Following training exercises with the 6th Flotilla from 16 July 1939 to 1 October 1939, U-42 was moved into active service with the 6th Flotilla, ready for operations. The day after her training exercises ended, she left Wilhelmshaven on 2 October. On a 12-day journey, U-42 traveled into the North Sea and circumnavigated the British Isles. She then entered the North Atlantic in search of any Allied convoys. During this operation, one enemy ship was damaged, the 4,803 GRT British steam freighter SS Stonepool, which had become separated from Convoy OB 17 while sailing from Liverpool, England to North America. On 13 Oct U-42 battle surfaced and engaged the ship with her deck gun, hitting her several times before being driven back under by the impressively accurate return fire from the merchantman.  This was to be the boat's first and only attack on any Allied merchant vessel.

Fate
This attack took place off the southwest coast of neutral Ireland. Of the 46 man crew, 26 were killed in the depth charge attack, 20 crew members survived and were made prisoners of war by the British. The youngest crew member aboard U-42 was Rudolf Nuggel who was born on 22 December 1919 and was among the 26 dead. He was 19 years old with his 20th birthday just over two months away. The captain, Rolf Dau, was the oldest known crew member of U-42. He was born on 1 April 1906 and was 33 years old at the time of the boat's sinking; he survived. U-42 was the fifth U-boat to be lost in World War II.

Summary of raiding history

References

Bibliography

External links

German Type IX submarines
U-boats commissioned in 1939
U-boats sunk in 1939
World War II submarines of Germany
World War II shipwrecks in the Atlantic Ocean
1939 ships
Ships built in Bremen (state)
U-boats sunk by depth charges
U-boats sunk by British warships
Maritime incidents in October 1939